The 1993 Slovak presidential elections were held between 26 January and 15 February 1993. Michal Kováč was elected as the first president of Slovakia and became the only Slovak president elected by Parliament. A candidate needed to receive 90 votes to be elected.

Results

First Ballot

Second Ballot

References

1993
Slovakia
1993 in Slovakia
Indirect elections
January 1993 events in Europe
February 1993 events in Europe